The 41st congressional district of New York was a congressional district for the United States House of Representatives in New York. It was created in 1913 as a result of the 1910 Census. It was eliminated in 1973 as a result of the 1970 redistricting cycle after the 1970 United States census. It was last represented by Thaddeus J. Dulski who was redistricted into the 37th District.

List of members representing the district

Election results
The following chart shows historic election results. Bold type indicates victor. Italic type indicates incumbent.

References 

 Congressional Biographical Directory of the United States 1774–present
 Election Statistics 1920-present Clerk of the House of Representatives

41
Former congressional districts of the United States
1913 establishments in New York (state)
1973 disestablishments in New York (state)
Constituencies established in 1913
Constituencies disestablished in 1973